Thlologelo Malatji (born 18 March 1993) is a South African politician and a Member of the National Assembly of South Africa. Malatji is a member of the African National Congress.

Early life and education
Malatji was born on 18 March 1993 in Tembisa in the former Transvaal Province. He studied municipal governance at the University of Johannesburg. He is currently studying for a social sciences degree at the University of the Witwatersrand.

Political career
Malatji was just 13 years old when he joined the Congress of South African Students (COSAS). He served as the organisation's regional secretary in Ekurhuleni, as the chairperson of an African National Congress Youth League branch, as the provincial secretary of COSAS in Gauteng, as a member of the National Executive Committee, as the national president of COSAS and as the regional deputy chairperson of the ANC youth league. Malatji is currently the convenor of the ANC youth league in Ekurhuleni.

He was cited by the Mail & Guardian as one of the "Top 200 Young South Africans" for his work in Politics and Government in 2018. He was number 85 on Avance Media's list of the 100 Most Influential Young South Africans in 2020.

Parliamentary career
Malatji was the 18th candidate on the African National Congress Regional Gauteng Election List for the general election on 8 May 2019. He was elected as the ANC won 26 list seats in Gauteng and was sworn into office on 22 May 2019. He sat on the Portfolio Committee on Higher Education, Science and Technology between June 2019 and August 2021. As of August 2021, he sits on the newly recreated  Portfolio Committee on Human Settlements.

References

External links
Profile at Parliament of South Africa

Living people
1993 births
People from Gauteng
Members of the National Assembly of South Africa
African National Congress politicians
University of Johannesburg alumni